The 1873 Connecticut gubernatorial election was held on April 7, 1873. Former state legislator and Democratic nominee Charles R. Ingersoll defeated Republican nominee Henry P. Haven with 51.86% of the vote.

General election

Candidates
Major party candidates
Charles R. Ingersoll, Democratic
Henry P. Haven, Republican

Other candidates
Henry D. Smith, Temperance

Results

References

1873
Connecticut
Gubernatorial